Season 1 of Bachelor in Paradise Canada premiered on October 10, 2021, on Citytv.

Casting 
On April 29, 2021, Jesse Jones was announced as the host of the inaugural season. Kevin Wendt, who previously starred on The Bachelorette Canada, The Bachelor Winter Games, and season 5 of Bachelor in Paradise was announced as the bartender on April 5, 2021.

The 26 contestants were announced on September 14, 2021. It features 12 alumni from the US and Canada versions of the show. It also features 14 Canadian fans, who have never been featured on the show, from Bachelor Nation. Maria Garcia-Sanchez was a late addition to the cast, making the number of contestants 27.

Contestants

Elimination table

Key 
  The contestant is male
  The contestant is female
  The contestant went on a date and gave out a rose at the rose ceremony
  The contestant went on a date and got a rose at the rose ceremony
  The contestant gave or received a rose at the rose ceremony, thus remaining in the competition
  The contestant received the last rose
  The contestant went on a date and received the last rose
  The contestant went on a date and was eliminated
  The contestant was eliminated
  The contestant had a date and voluntarily left the show
  The contestant voluntarily left the show
  The couple left together to pursue a relationship
  The couple broke up and was eliminated
  The couple had a date, then broke up and was eliminated
  The contestant split after Bachelor in Paradise ended
  The couple decided to stay together and won the competition
  The contestant had to wait before appearing in paradise

Episodes

References 

2021 Canadian television seasons